Georgia Roche (born 3 September 2000) is an English professional rugby league footballer for Leeds Rhinos in the Rugby Football League Women's Super League.

Roche played for amateur club Dewsbury Moor during which time she represented Yorkshire in the 2018 Women's Rugby League Association County of Origin against Lancashire and scored Yorkshire's only points in a 10–4 defeat.

In 2017 Roche joined Featherstone Rovers Ladies, for the inaugural season of the Women's Super League.  At the end of the season Featherstone qualified for the Grand Final and Roche scored all of Featherstone's points (1 try, 1 goal) in a 36–6 defeat to Bradford Bulls Women.

Over the winter Roche moved from Featherstone to Castleford and helped Castleford to the final of the 2018 RFL Women's Challenge Cup.  In the final she scored one of Castleford's three tries in the 20–14 defeat to Leeds Rhinos Women.

At the 2018 Man of Steel Awards on 8 October 2018 Roche was named as the inaugural winner of the Woman of Steel award. In the same month Roche was one of the ten nominees for the 2018 BBC Young Sports Personality of the Year and was also shortlisted for the first women's Golden Boot Award.
Roche made her international debut for England against France in Carcasonne on 27 October 2018, scoring two tries in England's 54–4 win.

Following a 2019 domestic season in which Roche helped Castleford to the League Leaders Shield in the 2019 RFL Women's Super League she was selected to be part of the England squads for both the test series against the Papua New Guinea Orchids and the World 9s tournament in October and November 2019.

Roche played in the June 2021 Test Match for England against Wales.

References

2000 births
Living people
Castleford Tigers Women players
England women's national rugby league team players
English female rugby league players
Rugby league halfbacks
Rugby league locks
Rugby league players from Batley